Karpen is a coastal village situated in the central plains of Albania's Western Lowlands region. It is part of Tirana County. During the 2015 local government reforms, it became part of Kavajë municipality.

References

Populated places in Kavajë
Villages in Tirana County